Rank is the surname of:

 J. Arthur Rank, 1st Baron Rank (1888–1972), British industrialist and film producer
 Joseph Rank (1854-1943), founder of Rank Hovis McDougall, one of the UK's largest food production and flour-milling businesses
 Otto Rank (1884–1939), Austrian psychoanalyst, writer, teacher, and therapist
 Michael Rank (1950-2017), journalist, translator and China and Tibet specialist